Subotić is a South Slavic surname. Notable people with the surname include:
Dejan Subotić (1852–1920), Serbo-Russian general
Ana Subotić (born 1983), Serbian long-distance runner
Bojan Subotić (born 1990), Serbian basketball player
Danijel Subotić (born 1989), Swiss footballer
Jovan Subotić (1817–1886), Serbian lawyer, writer and politician
Mitar Subotić (1961–1999), Serbian musician
Neven Subotić (born 1988), Serbian footballer
Slobodan Subotić (born 1956), Slovenian basketball player
Stanko Subotić (born 1959), Serbian businessman

See also
Subotica

Serbian surnames